Paul Sirett is an English dramatist best known for his popular music-related shows. His plays and musicals have been awarded Best Off-West End Musical, Whatsonstage's Best Play, Pearson's Best New Play, City Life's Best Writer & Best Play.

Shows
Oxy & The Morons - by Paul Sirett, Mike Peters and Steve Allan Jones for New Wolsey Theatre (2017)
Reasons To Be Cheerful - featuring the music of Ian Dury and The Blockheads New Wolsey Theatre by Paul Sirett, directed by Jenny Sealey (2010)
Polish-Speaking Romanians - Dorota Masłowska translated by Lisa Goldman and Paul Sirett 
The Big Life - Paul Sirett nominated for Laurence Olivier Award for Best New Musical 2006
The Iron Man - adapted from the Ted Hughes story for Graeae Theatre Company
Come Dancing - Ray Davies and Paul Sirett for Theatre Royal Stratford East
Jamaica House - Paul Sirett for Theatre Workshop which had a site-specific performance on the top floor of a tower block
Running the Silk Road by Paul Sirett for Yellow Earth Theatre
Lush Life - with the music of Ella Fitzgerald Live Theatre, Newcastle 2005.
The Mandelson Files - short play about Peter Mandleson played at BAC in London.Skaville - homage to two-tone and skaCrusade - on conflict in the Middle East for Stratford East.Worlds Apart - on  immigration control Stratford East 1993.A Night in Tunisia - about a be-bop saxophonist Stratford East 1992.

See also
Bliss (British band) Coventry
Additional guitar on Sue (album) Frazier Chorus 1989

References

English dramatists and playwrights
Living people
Year of birth missing (living people)